Mattias Tichy (born 12 October 1974 in Fristad) is a Swedish rower.

References 
 
 

1974 births
Living people
Swedish male rowers
Olympic rowers of Sweden
Rowers at the 1996 Summer Olympics
World Rowing Championships medalists for Sweden